Ratje is a small village in the Municipality of Žužemberk in southeastern Slovenia. The area is part of the historical region of Lower Carniola. The municipality is now included in the Southeast Slovenia Statistical Region.

Church

The local church is dedicated to Saints Primus and Felician and belongs to the Parish of Hinje. It has a Romanesque nave and an 18th-century belfry.

References

External links
Ratje at Geopedia

Populated places in the Municipality of Žužemberk